Luis Otero Mujica (1879, Putaendo – 1940) was a general and Commander-in-chief of the Chilean Army. He took office as commander-in-chief on 3 August 1932 and left the same year on 26 December.

1879 births
1940 deaths
People from Putaendo
Chilean people of Galician descent
Chilean Ministers of Defense
Chilean Army generals